Plant-animal interactions are important pathways for the transfer of energy within ecosystems, where both advantageous and unfavorable interactions support ecosystem health. Plant-animal interactions can take on important ecological functions and manifest in a variety of combinations of favorable and unfavorable associations, for example predation, frugivory and herbivory, parasitism, and mutualism. Without mutualistic relationships, some plants may not be able to complete their life cycles, and the animals may starve due to resource deficiency.

Evolution

Relationship 

Defoliation or root removal caused by herbivory can control or reduce the overall phytomass, but it can also promote species diversity and have an impact on plant dispersion, which in turn controls ecological stability. In mutualistic relationships between pollinators and plants, the former receives food from the latter and in exchange acts as a plant propagation agent and a gene-transfer vector. The intricate web of species-specificity, habitat choice, and coevolution between plants and their pollinators has already been clarified by studies examining the feeding behaviors of pollinators and their interactive role in maintaining ecosystems. True mutualisms also promote development and provide pathogen protection. Plant growth and development are aided by mutualistic interactions between animals and plants, such as those between nematodes and insects.

Types

Predation 
Predation is a biological interaction where one organism, the predator, kills and eats another organism, its prey. There are carnivorous plants as well as herbivores and carnivores that consume plants and animals, respectively. Due to the extremely low nutritional content of the soil in which they grow and extra nitrogen is needed by the plants, therefore carnivorous plants eat insects. By photosynthesis, these plants continue to receive energy from the sun.

Parasitism 
Parasitism is a close relationship between species, where one organism, the parasite, lives on or inside another organism, the host, causing it some harm, and is adapted structurally to this way of life. Plant parasites are a common term for sap-sucking insects like aphids.

Commensalism 
Commensalism is the term used to describe a situation in which one organism gains and the other is neither harmed nor benefited. For instance, epiphytes on tree trunks in rain forests are aided by the trees because they provide a surface for their growth. Unless the epiphytes' weight becomes so great that the tree branches break, the epiphytes don't seem to have any effect on the trees.

Mutualism 

When both species gain from their interaction, mutualism develops. The mutualistic link between pollinators and plants is very well illustrated. In this instance, the animal pollinator (bee, butterfly, beetle, hummingbird, etc.) receives nourishment in exchange for carrying the plants' pollen from flower to flower (usually nectar or pollen). Another common method of seed dispersion involves an alliance between the plant and the animal that disperses the seeds. The tasty fruit that encases the seeds is consumed by numerous animals. The seeds are subsequently dispersed in a new spot some distance from the parent plant, frequently with feces that also serves as a little amount of fertilizer.
In every ecosystem, there are interactions of this nature between species.

References 

Ecology